Rolfe Photoplays Inc. was an American motion picture production company established by musical entertainer B.A. Rolfe. Its productions were primarily filmed on the East Coast, usually in and around Fort Lee, New Jersey, although the company also filmed in California. Its films were distributed through an agreement with Louis B. Mayer's Metro Pictures Corporation.

Between 1915 and 1918, B.A. Rolfe used Rolfe Photoplays Inc. to produce forty-nine silent films, several of which were collaborations with director/screenwriter Oscar A.C. Lund including the 1916 drama "Dorian's Divorce" starring Lionel Barrymore. As well, he used the corporate name "B.A. Rolfe Photoplayers Inc." and
"B.A. Rolfe Productions" to produce another three films including the 1919 fifteen-part mystery serial The Master Mystery starring Harry Houdini.
Maxwell Karger was an executive at the studio.
By 1920, the B.A. Rolfe production companies ceased operating.

References

Mass media companies established in 1915
Mass media companies disestablished in 1920
Defunct American film studios
Articles containing video clips
Film production companies of the United States
1915 establishments in New Jersey
1920 disestablishments in New Jersey